The Viletones are a Canadian punk band from Toronto, Ontario, Canada, led by Steven Leckie on vocals. Other members from the original line-up were Freddie Pompeii, (some sources list him as 'Frederick DiPasquale') on guitar/vocals; Chris Hate (Chris Paputts), on bass guitar/vocals and Mike Anderson, (1955–2012) on the drums/vocals.  The original line-up was active in 1976 and 1977, and thereafter featured Steven Leckie as the only original member, with various backing musicians.

Career
The Viletones are one of the first generation punk rock bands from Toronto, Ontario, Canada. Steven Leckie founded the band, and footage of the band can be found on the official Viletones website. They appeared on the front cover of various magazines, including Leckie on the front cover of Record Week and Fanfare.

From July 7–10, 1977, the group joined The Diodes and Teenage Head at the New York punk club CBGB at a showcase featuring "three outrageous punk bands from Toronto, Canada".  The rock critic Lester Bangs described the show in an April 29, 1981 article for the Village Voice: "This guy Nazi Dog hung from the rafters, crawled all over the stage, and hurled himself on the first row until his body was one huge sore." The concert was spoofed in an early episode of the television comedy show SCTV, where comedian Rick Moranis as newscaster David Brinkley, looking a little rough, reviews a Viletones concert.

Also that year, The Viletones released their first single, "Screamin Fist" b/w "Possibilities" and "Rebel" on their own label Vile Records.

In 1978, they released Look Back In Anger, which featured the songs "Don't You Lie" and "Dirty Feeling", b/w "Back Door To Hell", "Swastika Girl" and "Danger Boy". The same year Pompeii, Hate and X abruptly left The Viletones to form The Secrets. That year, the new lineup of the Viletones appeared at the concert The Last Pogo, filmed at the Horseshoe Tavern in Toronto May 1, 1978, and became a feature film documentary, which was followed by a sequel in 2013.

At the Rock Against Radiation concert in Nathan Phillips Square, Toronto, on July 19, 1980, The Viletones shared a bill with DOA, Stark Naked and the Fleshtones, Forgotten Rebels and Joe College and The Rulers.

In 1983, The Viletones released their first full-length album, Saturday Night, Sunday Morning, recorded live at Larry's Hideaway in Toronto.  Later that decade, they released a U.S.-only release, Live At Max's. In 1994, the record label Other Peoples Music, released a retrospective, A Taste Of Honey. Leckie also ran an art gallery in Toronto called Fleurs Du Mal; notable patrons included The Sex Pistols manager Malcolm McLaren. Leckie discovered and mentored various young artists whom later went on to be auctioned at Waddington's and Ritchie's. Leckie also made a brief appearance in the film, American Psycho.

A reference to their song, "Screamin Fist", turned up in the pages of Neuromancer, a novel by William Gibson, and a computer virus was also named after the song.

Over time, other members of the Viletones included Screamin' Sam Ferrara (bass), Tony Vincent (drums), Steve Koch (guitar), Steven Stergiu (guitar), Conrad Wiggins (guitar), Ian Blurton (guitar), Scott McCullough (guitar), Jeff Zurba (drums), Steve Scarlet (guitar).

After a reunion, the Viletones released their first commercial music video, which received regular rotation on Much Music, MTV (America & Europe) and some coverage on the BBC. The first comeback show with the new lineup was recorded live by Doug McClement and was released soon after. It featured live material and three new tracks written by Leckie and Stergiu, and was their first new material since the early 1980s. This release was called What It Feels Like To Kill (1998). Leckie and Stergiu then relocated to London and formed a British version of the band.

In November 2012, Steven Leckie posted an obituary for original drummer, Mike "Motor X" Andersen, on his Facebook page, which was featured in Now Magazine. Leckie has also performed as a spoken word artist, reading from his yet unpublished autobiography tentatively titled 'Screamin Fist', and has appeared on various panels and discussion groups on the subject of addiction and recovery.

The Viletones most recent performance was on August 15, 2015, despite Leckie's battle with multiple sclerosis, and was filmed in 3-D by Regg Hartt for Cineforum.

Discography

Singles and EPs
1977 "Screaming Fist" (7" single: "Screaming Fist", "Possibilities", "Rebel")
1978 Look Back In Anger (7" EP: "Don't You Lie", "Dirty Feelin", "Back Door To Hell", "Swastika Girl", "Danger Boy")
2013 "Auschwitz Jerk" (7" single: "Auschwitz Jerk", "Wet Dream Girl", "Heinrich Himmler")

Albums
1983 Saturday Night, Sunday Morning
1994 A Taste of Honey (recorded 1977)
1998 What It Feels Like to Kill (As "Steven Leckie & Viletones")

References

External links
 Viletones official website
Discography at Discogs.com

1977 establishments in Ontario
Musical groups established in 1977
Musical groups reestablished in 1983
Musical groups from Toronto
Canadian punk rock groups